The Wine Down with Mary J. Blige is an American primetime talk show series, hosted by singer and actress Mary J. Blige, that premiered on March 1, 2023, on BET.

Episodes

Production
On December 16, 2022, the series was in development by BET. On February 15, 2023, it was announced that the talk show would premiere on March 1, 2023.

References

External links

2020s American television talk shows
BET original programming
English-language television shows
Mary J. Blige